Major André Édouard Turcat (23 October 1921 – 4 January 2016) was a French Air Force pilot and test pilot celebrated for flying the first prototype of Concorde for its maiden flight.

Turcat was born on 23 October 1921 in Marseille (Bouches-du-Rhône) into a family in the automotive industry. He studied at Ecole Polytechnique.

Biography
After graduating from École Polytechnique in 1942, Turcat joined the Free French Air Forces during the final years of World War II and stayed with Armée de l'Air after the war.  During the Indochina War, Turcat served as a pilot of C-47 transport aircraft and demonstrated exceptional skills in handling a number of flight emergencies, thus earning an assignment to EPNER, France's test pilot school.

Shortly after graduating, Turcat took over the test campaign of the Nord 1500 Griffon, one of the world's first ramjet-powered aircraft.  During this successful program, Turcat flew the Griffon at Mach 2.19, a feat that earned him the prestigious Harmon Trophy in 1958.  A few months later (25 February 1959), Turcat broke the world speed record over 100 kilometers with the Griffon, at an average 1,643 km/h (1,021 mph).

Turcat left the military after the Griffon program ended and joined state-owned aircraft manufacturer Sud Aviation as the Concorde supersonic transport (SST) program was starting.  He became Concorde's chief test pilot and Sud Aviation's director of flight testing.  On 2 March 1969, Turcat had the honour of flying the first prototype of Concorde for its maiden flight.  Later that year (1 October), he was also at the controls for Concorde's first supersonic flight.  Turcat conducted the rest of the French side of the Concorde test program (Brian Trubshaw being the chief test pilot on the British side), and retired from active flying duty in the late 1970s. Both Turcat and Trubshaw were awarded the Ivan C. Kincheloe Award for their work on the Concorde test programme.

He was the founder and first president for the Académie nationale de l'air et de l'espace (ANAE) in 1983. The Academy is known as  Académie de l'Air et de l'Espace since 2007. He was present on board the Air France Concorde (F-BVFC) during its retirement flight, on 27 June 2003, to the Airbus plant at Toulouse, where the French aircraft was built . He was an author and wrote several books. Among the latest are Concorde essais et batailles (1977) and Pilote d'essais: Mémoires (2005), both in French.

In 1998, Turcat was inducted into the International Air & Space Hall of Fame at the San Diego Air & Space Museum.

References

1921 births
2016 deaths
Concorde pilots
Free French military personnel of World War II
French aviation record holders
French test pilots
Harmon Trophy winners
Ramjet engines
Recipients of the Legion of Honour
People from Marseille